The Turkish Publishers Association (TYB) is the oldest national association for publishers in Turkey. It was founded in 1985, and in 2013 counted around 300 publishing companies and distributors as members. It is a member of the International Publishers Association.

It awards the Freedom of Thought and Expression Prize annually since 1995; recipients include Meltem Arıkan (2004), Perihan Mağden (2008), Sel Publishing House (2009), Nedim Şener (2010), and İsmail Saymaz (2012).

References

External links
 Official website

1985 establishments in Turkey
Business organizations based in Turkey
Publishing organizations